Nicodemo "Nik" Spatari (16 April 1929 – 25 August 2020) was an Italian painter, sculptor, architect, and art scholar. He created the "Parco-Museo Santa Barbara", known also as MUSABA, an open-air art museum realised in the 10th century  area close to Spatari's birthplace of Mammola, in south-eastern Calabria.

References

Bibliography
 Nik Spatari, L'enigma delle arti asittite nella Calabria ultra-mediterranea, Reggio C., Iiriti ed., 2002,

External links
MUSABA Fondazione Spatari/Maas | Calabria - Italia

1929 births
2020 deaths
20th-century Italian architects
Italian male painters
Italian male sculptors
People from Calabria